The 2016–17 Dallas Mavericks season was the 37th season of the franchise in the National Basketball Association (NBA). For the first time since 2013, the Mavs did not qualify for the playoffs. This was their first losing season since 2000.

Draft

Roster

Standings

Division

Conference

Game log

Pre-season

|-bgcolor=ffcccc
| 1 
| October 1
| @ New Orleans
| 
| Justin Anderson (14)
| Dwight Powell (7)
| four players (3)
| CenturyLink Center (Bossier City)6,752
| 0–1
|-bgcolor=ccffcc
| 2
| October 3
| Charlotte
| 
| Seth Curry (20)
| A. J. Hammons (9)
| Brussino,Gibson (7)
| American Airlines Center19,219
| 1–1
|-bgcolor=ffcccc
| 3
| October 8
| @ Milwaukee
| 
| Dwight Powell (15)
| Barnes,Powell (7)
| five players (2)
| Kohl Center (Madison)10,560
| 1–2
|-bgcolor=ccffcc
| 4
| October 11
| Oklahoma City
| 
| Dwight Powell (16)
| Andrew Bogut (11)
| Jonathan Gibson (7)
| American Airlines Center18,329
| 2–2
|-bgcolor=ffcccc
| 5
| October 14
| @ Phoenix
| 
| Deron Williams (17)
| Andrew Bogut (10)
| Andrew Bogut (4)
| Talking Stick Resort Arena12,209
| 2–3
|-bgcolor=ffcccc
| 6
| October 19
| Houston
| 
| Wesley Matthews (15)
| Andrew Bogut (7)
| Curry,Williams (7)
| American Airlines Center18,988
| 2–4
|-bgcolor=ffcccc
| 7
| October 21
| @ Denver
| 
| Wesley Matthews (10)
| Justin Anderson (5)
| Gibson,Williams (5)
| Pepsi Center8,453
| 2–5

Regular season

|-bgcolor=ffcccc
| 1
| October 26
| @ Indiana
| 
| Deron Williams (25)
| Harrison Barnes (9)
| Deron Williams (7)
| Bankers Life Fieldhouse17,923
| 0–1
|-bgcolor=ffcccc
| 2
| October 28
| Houston
| 
| Harrison Barnes (31)
| Andrew Bogut (12)
| J. J. Barea (5)
| American Airlines Center20,163
| 0–2
|-bgcolor=ffcccc
| 3
| October 30
| @ Houston
| 
| Wesley Matthews (25)
| Andrew Bogut (14)
| J. J. Barea (5)
| Toyota Center18,055
| 0–3

|-bgcolor=ffcccc
| 4
| November 2
| @ Utah
| 
| Harrison Barnes (14)
| Andrew Bogut (9)
| Deron Williams (9)
| Vivint Smart Home Arena19,318
| 0–4
|-bgcolor=ffcccc
| 5
| November 4
| Portland
| 
| J. J. Barea (23)
| Harrison Barnes (10)
| Barea,Williams (6)
| American Airlines Center19,475
| 0–5
|-bgcolor=ccffcc
| 6
| November 6
| Milwaukee
| 
| Harrison Barnes (34)
| Andrew Bogut (16)
| J. J. Barea (5)
| American Airlines Center19,345
| 1–5
|-bgcolor=ccffcc
| 7
| November 8
| @ LA Lakers
| 
| Harrison Barnes (31)
| Andrew Bogut (8)
| J. J. Barea (8)
| Staples Center18,997
| 2–5
|-bgcolor=ffcccc
| 8
| November 9
| @ Golden State
| 
| Harrison Barnes (25)
| Dwight Powell (9)
| Seth Curry (9)
| Oracle Arena19,596
| 2–6
|-bgcolor=ffcccc
| 9
| November 14
| @ New York
| 
| Harrison Barnes (20)
| Andrew Bogut (9)
| J. J. Barea (4)
| Madison Square Garden19,812
| 2–7
|-bgcolor=ffcccc
| 10
| November 16
| @ Boston
| 
| Harrison Barnes (28)
| Dwight Powell (8)
| J. J. Barea (6)
| TD Garden 18,624
| 2–8
|-bgcolor=ffcccc
| 11
| November 18
| Memphis
| 
| Harrison Barnes (15)
| Andrew Bogut (10)
| Jonathan Gibson (3)
| American Airlines Center19,715
| 2–9
|-bgcolor=ffcccc
| 12
| November 19
| @ Orlando
| 
| Jonathan Gibson (26)
| Andrew Bogut (8)
| Seth Curry (4)
| Amway Center18,846
| 2–10
|-bgcolor=ffcccc
| 13
| November 21
| @ San Antonio
| 
| Seth Curry (23)
| Salah Mejri (11)
| Curry, Matthews (4)
| AT&T Center18,418
| 2–11
|-bgcolor=ffcccc
| 14
| November 23
| LA Clippers
| 
| Harrison Barnes (22)
| Andrew Bogut (12)
| Andrew Bogut (6)
| American Airlines Center20,042
| 2–12
|-bgcolor=ffcccc
| 15
| November 25
| @ Cleveland
| 
| Dirk Nowitzki (15)
| Andrew Bogut (11)
| Brussino, Williams (5)
| Quicken Loans Arena20,562
| 2–13
|-bgcolor=ccffcc
| 16
| November 27
| New Orleans
| 
| Harrison Barnes (23)
| Andrew Bogut (14)
| Barnes, Williams  (4)
| American Airlines Center19,302
| 3–13
|-bgcolor=ffcccc
| 17
| November 30
| San Antonio
| 
| Wesley Matthews (26)
| Andrew Bogut (12)
| Bogut, Williams (5)
| American Airlines Center19,245
| 3–14

|-bgcolor=ffcccc
| 18
| December 1
| @ Charlotte
| 
| Harrison Barnes (17)
| Salah Mejri (11)
| Deron Williams (8)
| Spectrum Center14,471
| 3–15
|-bgcolor=ccffcc
| 19
| December 3
| Chicago
| 
| Wesley Matthews (26)
| Andrew Bogut (11)
| Deron Williams (15)
| American Airlines Center19,857
| 4–15
|-bgcolor=ffcccc
| 20
| December 5
| Charlotte
| 
| Harrison Barnes (29)
| Barnes, Powell (7)
| Deron Williams (13)
| American Airlines Center19,228
| 4–16
|-bgcolor=ffcccc
| 21
| December 7
| Sacramento
| 
| Deron Williams (20)
| Salah Mejri (7)
| Deron Williams (6)
| American Airlines Center19,711
| 4–17
|-bgcolor=ccffcc
| 22
| December 9
| Indiana
| 
| Wesley Matthews (26)
| Barnes, Finney-Smith (8)
| Curry, Williams (6)
| American Airlines Center19,486
| 5–17
|-bgcolor=ffcccc
| 23
| December 10
| @ Houston
| 
| Wesley Matthews (26)
| Dwight Powell (6)
| Deron Williams (6)
| Toyota Center15,761
| 5–18
|-bgcolor=ccffcc
| 24
| December 12
| Denver
| 
| Wesley Matthews (25)
| Dorian Finney-Smith (8)
| Deron Williams (8)
| American Airlines Center19,425
| 6–18
|-bgcolor=ffcccc
| 25
| December 14
| Detroit
| 
| Harrison Barnes (19)
| Salah Mejri (8)
| Deron Williams (5)
| American Airlines Center19,687
| 6–19
|-bgcolor=ffcccc
| 26
| December 16
| @ Utah
| 
| Harrison Barnes (21)
| Curry, Mejri (5)
| Deron Williams (7)
| Vivint Smart Home Arena18,721
| 6–20
|-bgcolor=ccffcc
| 27
| December 18
| Sacramento
| 
| Dorian Finney-Smith (17)
| Harrison Barnes (9)
| Deron Williams (7)
| American Airlines Center19,504
| 7–20
|-bgcolor=ffcccc
| 28
| December 19
| @ Denver
| 
| Deron Williams (23)
| Dwight Powell (9)
| Deron Williams (8)
| Pepsi Center12,581
| 7–21
|-bgcolor=ccffcc
| 29
| December 21
| @ Portland
| 
| Harrison Barnes (28)
| Dwight Powell (8)
| Deron Williams (5)
| Moda Center19,393
| 8–21
|-bgcolor=ccffcc
| 30
| December 23
| @ LA Clippers
| 
| Harrison Barnes (24)
| Salah Mejri (8)
| Deron Williams (9)
| Staples Center19,060
| 9–21
|-bgcolor=ffcccc
| 31
| December 26
| @ New Orleans
| 
| Deron Williams (24)
| Harrison Barnes (7)
| Deron Williams (9)
| Smoothie King Center15,764
| 9–22
|-bgcolor=ffcccc
| 32
| December 27
| Houston
| 
| Harrison Barnes (21)
| Justin Anderson (8)
| Deron Williams (6)
| American Airlines Center20,425
| 9–23
|-bgcolor=ccffcc
| 33
| December 29
| @ LA Lakers
| 
| Wesley Matthews (20)
| Harrison Barnes (9)
| Deron Williams (11)
| Staples Center18,997
| 10–23
|-bgcolor=ffcccc
| 34
| December 30
| @ Golden State
| 
| Harrison Barnes (25)
| Dwight Powell (13)
| Curry, Jackson (5)
| Oracle Arena19,596
| 10–24

|-bgcolor=ccffcc
| 35
| January 3
| Washington
| 
| Deron Williams (21)
| Dirk Nowitzki (9)
| Deron Williams (6)
| American Airlines Center19,318
| 11–24
|-bgcolor=ffcccc
| 36
| January 5
| Phoenix
| 
| Deron Williams (20)
| Dirk Nowitzki (7)
| Deron Williams (6)
| American Airlines Center19,570
| 11–25
|-bgcolor=ffcccc
| 37
| January 7
| Atlanta
| 
| Harrison Barnes (21)
| Andrew Bogut (11)
| J. J. Barea (7)
| American Airlines Center19,655
| 11–26
|-bgcolor=ffcccc
| 38
| January 9
| @ Minnesota
| 
| Harrison Barnes (30)
| Dirk Nowitzki (5)
| Deron Williams (7)
| Target Center9,625
| 11–27
|-bgcolor=ccffcc
| 39
| January 12
| @ Phoenix
| 
| Deron Williams (23)
| Salah Mejri (7)
| Deron Williams (12)
| Mexico City Arena19,874
| 12–27
|-bgcolor=ccffcc
| 40
| January 15
| Minnesota
| 
| Wesley Matthews (19)
| Salah Mejri (8)
| Deron Williams (10)
| American Airlines Center19,655
| 13–27
|-bgcolor=ccffcc
| 41
| January 17
| @ Chicago
| 
| Harrison Barnes (20)
| Dirk Nowitzki (10)
| Deron Williams (9)
| United Center21,294
| 14–27
|-bgcolor=ffcccc
| 42
| January 19
| @ Miami
| 
| Dirk Nowitzki (19)
| Harrison Barnes (7)
| Deron Williams (9)
| American Airlines Arena19,600
| 14–28
|-bgcolor=ffcccc
| 43
| January 20
| Utah
| 
| Harrison Barnes (19)
| Dirk Nowitzki (10)
| Deron Williams (8)
| American Airlines Center19,421
| 14–29
|-bgcolor=ccffcc
| 44
| January 22
| LA Lakers
| 
| Justin Anderson (19)
| Finney-Smith, Powell (7)
| Deron Williams (8)
| American Airlines Center19,484
| 15–29
|-bgcolor=ccffcc
| 45
| January 25
| New York
| 
| Harrison Barnes (23)
| three players (5)
| Deron Williams (7)
| American Airlines Center19,750
| 16–29
|-bgcolor=ffcccc
| 46
| January 26
| @ Oklahoma City
| 
| Harrison Barnes (31)
| Brussino, Mejri (6)
| Curry, Jackson (4)
| Chesapeake Energy Arena18,203
| 16–30
|-bgcolor=ccffcc
| 47
| January 29
| @ San Antonio
| 
| Seth Curry (24)
| Curry, Nowitzki (10)
| Yogi Ferrell (7)
| AT&T Center18,418
| 17–30
|-bgcolor=ccffcc
| 48
| January 30
| Cleveland
| 
| Harrison Barnes (24)
| Harrison Barnes (11)
| Devin Harris (5)
| American Airlines Center20,202
| 18–30

|-bgcolor=ccffcc
| 49
| February 1
| Philadelphia
| 
| Seth Curry (22)
| Salah Mejri (17)
| Seth Curry (6)
| American Airlines Center19,263
| 19–30
|-bgcolor=ccffcc
| 50
| February 3
| @ Portland
| 
| Yogi Ferrell (32)
| Harrison Barnes (7)
| Yogi Ferrell (5)
| Moda Center19,393
| 20–30
|-bgcolor=ffcccc
| 51
| February 6
| @ Denver
| 
| Curry, Ferrell (15)
| Wesley Matthews (7)
| Wesley Matthews (8)
| Pepsi Center13,047
| 20–31
|-bgcolor=ffcccc
| 52
| February 7
| Portland
| 
| Harrison Barnes (26)
| Devin Harris (7)
| Wesley Matthews (5)
| American Airlines Center19,526
| 20–32
|-bgcolor=ccffcc
| 53
| February 9
| Utah
| 
| Harrison Barnes (31)
| Dirk Nowitzki (7)
| Ferrell, Matthews (5)
| American Airlines Center19,883
| 21–32
|-bgcolor=ccffcc
| 54
| February 11
| Orlando
| 
| Wesley Matthews (20)
| Salah Mejri (15)
| Yogi Ferrell (7)
| American Airlines Center20,052
| 22–32
|-bgcolor=ffcccc
| 55
| February 13
| Boston
| 
| Yogi Ferrell (20)
| Salah Mejri (10)
| Curry, Ferrell (5)
| American Airlines Center20,159
| 22–33
|-bgcolor=ffcccc
| 56
| February 15
| @ Detroit
| 
| Dirk Nowitzki (24)
| Dirk Nowitzki (10)
| Deron Williams (6)
| The Palace of Auburn Hills13,549
| 22–34
|-bgcolor=ffcccc
| 57
| February 24
| @ Minnesota
| 
| Seth Curry (31)
| Nowitzki, Mejri (10)
| Yogi Ferrell (4)
| Target Center15,948
| 22–35
|-bgcolor=ccffcc
| 58
| February 25
| New Orleans
| 
| Harrison Barnes (19)
| Nerlens Noel (10)
| Seth Curry (8)
| American Airlines Center20,411
| 23–35
|-bgcolor=ccffcc
| 59
| February 27
| Miami
| 
| Seth Curry (29)
| Dirk Nowitzki (12)
| Yogi Ferrell (5)
| American Airlines Center19,539
| 24–35

|-bgcolor=ffcccc
| 60
| March 1
| @ Atlanta
| 
| Harrison Barnes (25)
| Dirk Nowitzki (10)
| Yogi Ferrell (9)
| Philips Arena12,483
| 24–36
|-bgcolor=ccffcc
| 61
| March 3
| Memphis
| 
| Seth Curry (24)
| Nerlens Noel (17)
| Devin Harris (6)
| American Airlines Center19,480
| 25–36
|-bgcolor=ccffcc
| 62
| March 5
| Oklahoma City
| 
| Seth Curry (22)
| Dirk Nowitzki (12)
| Devin Harris (6)
| American Airlines Center20,232
| 26–36
|-bgcolor=ccffcc
| 63
| March 7
| LA Lakers
| 
| Dirk Nowitzki (25)
| Dirk Nowitzki (11)
| Yogi Ferrell (7)
| American Airlines Center20,484
| 27–36
|-bgcolor=ccffcc
| 64
| March 10
| Brooklyn
| 
| Harrison Barnes (21)
| Dwight Powell (8)
| Seth Curry (4)
| American Airlines Center 20,022
| 28–36
|-bgcolor=ffcccc
| 65
| March 11
| Phoenix
| 
| Barnes, Nowitzki (23)
| Dirk Nowitzki (11)
| J. J. Barea (4)
| American Airlines Center20,324
| 28–37
|-bgcolor=ffcccc
| 66
| March 13
| @ Toronto
| 
| Harrison Barnes (18)
| Dwight Powell (10)
| Yogi Ferrell (6)
| Air Canada Centre19,800
| 28–38
|-bgcolor=ccffcc
| 67
| March 15
| @ Washington
| 
| Harrison Barnes (22)
| Barnes, Brussino (9)
| J. J. Barea (13)
| Verizon Center17,844
| 29–38
|-bgcolor=ffcccc
| 68
| March 17
| @ Philadelphia
| 
| Dwight Powell (14)
| Manny Harris (6)
| J. J. Barea (4)
| Wells Fargo Center17,642
| 29–39
|-bgcolor=ccffcc
| 69
| March 19
| @ Brooklyn
| 
| Dirk Nowitzki (23)
| Dirk Nowitzki (9)
| J. J. Barea (7)
| Barclays Center14,045
| 30–39
|-bgcolor=ffcccc
| 70
| March 21
| Golden State
| 
| Dirk Nowitzki (16)
| Dirk Nowitzki (9)
| J. J. Barea (6)
| American Airlines Center20,453
| 30–40
|-bgcolor=ccffcc
| 71
| March 23
| LA Clippers
| 
| Seth Curry (23)
| Nerlens Noel (12)
| Wesley Matthews (6)
| American Airlines Center19,703
| 31–40
|-bgcolor=ffcccc
| 72
| March 25
| Toronto
| 
| Harrison Barnes (23)
| Nerlens Noel (8)
| Wesley Matthews (5)
| American Airlines Center19,934
| 31–41
|-bgcolor=ffcccc
| 73
| March 27
| Oklahoma City
| 
| Matthews, Noel (15)
| Noel, Nowitzki (8)
| J. J. Barea (8)
| American Airlines Center19,970
| 31–42
|-bgcolor=ffcccc
| 74
| March 29
| @ New Orleans
| 
| Dirk Nowitzki (23)
| Harrison Barnes (8)
| J. J. Barea (11)
| Smoothie King Center16,000
| 31–43
|-bgcolor=ffcccc
| 75
| March 31
| @ Memphis
| 
| three players (13)
| Dirk Nowitzki (12)
| Wesley Matthews (7)
| FedExForum17,317
| 31–44

|-bgcolor=ccffcc
| 76
| April 2
| @ Milwaukee
| 
| Harrison Barnes (31)
| Dirk Nowitzki (5)
| Barea, Matthews (6)
| BMO Harris Bradley Center18,717
| 32–44
|-bgcolor=ffcccc
| 77
| April 4
| @ Sacramento
| 
| Nicolás Brussino (13)
| Nerlens Noel (10)
| Brussino, Ferrell (5)
| Golden 1 Center17,608
| 32–45
|-bgcolor=ffcccc
| 78
| April 5
| @ LA Clippers
| 
| Harrison Barnes (15)
| Salah Mejri (9)
| Ferrell, Matthews (6)
| Staples Center19,060
| 32–46
|-bgcolor=ffcccc
| 79
| April 7
| San Antonio
| 
| Dwight Powell (12)
| Nerlens Noel (9)
| J. J. Barea (8)
| American Airlines Center20,133
| 32–47
|-bgcolor=ffcccc
| 80
| April 9
| @ Phoenix
| 
| Ferrell, Powell (21)
| Dorian Finney-Smith (11)
| Nicolás Brussino (5)
| Talking Stick Resort Arena18,055
| 32–48
|-bgcolor=ffcccc
| 81
| April 11
| Denver
| 
| Dirk Nowitzki (21)
| Dirk Nowitzki (8)
| J. J. Barea (9)
| American Airlines Center20,333
| 32–49
|-bgcolor=ccffcc
| 82
| April 12
| @ Memphis
| 
| Brussino, Harris (15)
| three players (7)
| Devin Harris (8)
| FedExForum16,274
| 33–49

Player statistics

After all games.

|-
| ‡
| 6 || 0 || 8.0 || .294 || .125 || .667 || 1.3 || .0 || .0 || .0 || 2.2
|-
| †
| 51 || 2 || 13.9 || .402 || .303 || .795 || 2.9 || .6 || .5 || .3 || 6.5
|-
| 
| 35 || 6 || 22.0 || .414 || .358 || .863 || 2.4 || 5.5 || .4 || .0 || 10.9
|-
| 
| 79 || style=background:#0B60AD;color:white;|79 || style=background:#0B60AD;color:white;|35.5 || .468 || .351 || .861 || 5.0 || 1.5 || .8 || .2 || style=background:#0B60AD;color:white;|19.2
|-
| ‡
| 3 || 0 || 3.3 || .000 || .000 || .000 || .7 || .0 || .0 || .0 || .0
|-
| †
| 26 || 21 || 22.4 || .469 || .000 || .273 || style=background:#0B60AD;color:white;|8.3 || 1.9 || .5 || 1.0 || 3.0
|-
| 
| 54 || 2 || 9.6 || .369 || .305 || .773 || 1.7 || .9 || .3 || .1 || 2.8
|-
| ‡
| 5 || 0 || 15.4 || .440 || .357 || .000 || .6 || 2.4 || .2 || .0 || 5.4
|-
| 
| 70 || 42 || 29.0 || .481 || .425 || .850 || 2.5 || 2.7 || 1.1 || .1 || 12.8
|-
| 
| 36 || 29 || 29.1 || .412 || .403 || style=background:#0B60AD;color:white;|.877 || 2.8 || 4.3 || 1.1 || .2 || 11.3
|-
| 
| style=background:#0B60AD;color:white;|81 || 35 || 20.3 || .372 || .293 || .754 || 2.7 || .8 || .6 || .3 || 4.3
|-
| ‡
| 17 || 0 || 13.6 || .368 || .333 || .724 || 1.3 || 1.5 || .5 || .0 || 6.2
|-
| 
| 22 || 0 || 7.4 || .405 || style=background:#0B60AD;color:white;|.500 || .450 || 1.6 || .2 || .0 || .6 || 2.2
|-
| 
| 65 || 0 || 16.7 || .399 || .328 || .829 || 2.0 || 2.1 || .7 || .1 || 6.7
|-
| ‡
| 4 || 0 || 6.3 || .200 || .000 || .500 || 2.3 || .5 || .0 || .0 || 2.0
|-
| ‡
| 8 || 1 || 10.5 || .333 || .273 || .857 || 1.1 || 2.4 || .3 || .0 || 4.4
|-
| 
| 1 || 0 || 25.0 || .500 || .000 || .667 || 7.0 || .0 || style=background:#0B60AD;color:white;|2.0 || .0 || 8.0
|-
| 
| 73 || 73 || 34.2 || .393 || .363 || .816 || 3.6 || 2.9 || 1.1 || .2 || 13.5
|-
| 
| 73 || 11 || 12.4 || style=background:#0B60AD;color:white;|.642 || .333 || .590 || 4.2 || .2 || .4 || .8 || 2.9
|-
| 
| 22 || 12 || 22.0 || .575 || .000 || .708 || 6.8 || .9 || 1.0 || style=background:#0B60AD;color:white;|1.1 || 8.5
|-
| 
| 54 || 54 || 26.4 || .437 || .378 || .875 || 6.5 || 1.5 || .6 || .7 || 14.2
|-
| 
| 77 || 3 || 17.3 || .515 || .284 || .759 || 4.0 || .6 || .8 || .5 || 6.7
|-
| 
| 9 || 0 || 12.8 || .421 || .333 || .714 || 2.6 || 1.0 || .2 || .4 || 4.4
|-
| ‡
| 40 || 40 || 29.3 || .430 || .348 || .821 || 2.6 || style=background:#0B60AD;color:white;|6.9 || .6 || .1 || 13.1
|}
‡Waived during the season
†Traded during the season

Transactions

Overview

Trades

Free agents

Re-signed

Additions

Subtractions

Awards

References

Dallas Mavericks seasons
Dallas Mavericks
Dallas Mavericks
Dallas Mavericks
2010s in Dallas
2016 in Texas
2017 in Texas